Ó Maoilriain (anglicised as Ryan or Mulryan) is an Irish Gaelic clan based in what is today County Tipperary and County Limerick. The clan claims descent from Cathair Mór of the Laighin, but they first appear in the historical record in the 15th century in the kingdom of Thomond. John O'Donovan claims they are distinct from the Ryan clan which ruled Uí Dróna in what is today County Carlow.

Naming conventions

Overview

This family claim descent from one Maoil Riagháin, who was named in honour of a Saint Riagháin.

It is first documented as a surname in the 15th century in east Thomond/north Ormond, where the Ó Maoilriains attacked and displaced the  Ó hIfearnáin family. The territory they conquered became known as barony of Owney and Arra. Owney derived its name from one Uaithne Ó Maoilriain.

See also
 Éamonn an Chnoic
 MacGorman — another Laighin clan of Thomond

References

Bibliography
 The family of O'Mulryan in Spain, W.D. O'Ryan, The Irish Genealogist, 1961. 
 Records of Four Tipperary Septs: the O'Kennedys, O'Dwyers, O'Mulryans, and O'Meaghers, M. Callaghan, JAG Publishing, Galway, 1972.
 Ryan:O´ Maolilriain'', Dáithí Ó hÓgáin, Gill & Macmillan, Dublin, 2003.

External links
 Ryan at Araltas
 The O'Ryans of Owney by Donal F. Begley
 Clan Ryan Australia
 Clan Ryan at Tipperary Multeen Tourism
 Cromwellian Confiscations at Ireland Genealogy Project
 Ó Maoilriaghain at Library Ireland
 Ryan at The Irish Times
 The Origins of the Surname Ryan at The Tipperary Antiquarian

Surnames
Irish families
Surnames of Irish origin
Irish-language surnames
Families of Irish ancestry